Miss República Portuguesa is a national Beauty pageant in Portugal. The main winner of the contest is sent to Miss World.

History  
Miss República Portuguesa was made in 2011 by Isidro de Brito as Miss Mundo Portuguesa. In 2014, after undergoing a major restructuring process, the organization separated the two national pageants into separate events: "Miss Universo Portugal" and "Miss World Portugal".

Miss Universo Portugal

Before Miss República Portuguesa, the traditional pageant Miss Portugal was held in 1960 for the first time. The pageant used to send representatives for Portugal to the Miss World, Miss Universe and Miss International pageants. In 2011 the Miss Universo Portugal was held for the first time by GAETA, Promoções e Eventos, Lda. and NIU, the franchise holder of Miss Universe in Portugal.
In 2014 the Miss Universo Portugal branding was independently acquired by Isidiro de Brito under Miss República Portuguesa. The contest was separated by the organizers. He also owned Miss Supranational, Miss Grand International, Miss Intercontinental and other pageants to Miss República Portuguesa titleholders.
In 2016 Edward Walson partnered to Miss Universo Portugal. He is the owner of the Miss Universo Italia pageant.
In 2018 Isidiro de Brito owned major pageants and the Miss República Portuguesa Organization franchised Miss Universe, Miss World, Miss International and other pageants to Miss Portuguesa titleholders.

Titleholders

Miss República Portuguesa Organization
Miss República Portuguesa organization was made by Isidro de Brito and team. The organization previously called "Miss Mundo Portugal" and the winner represented Portugal at Miss World pageant. Since 2014 the new setting called "Miss República Portuguesa" or "Miss Portuguesa" will select the winner to Miss World and runner-ups will have opportunity representing Portugal at other pageants such as Miss Universe, Miss International, Miss Supranational and Miss Grand International.

Big Four pageants representatives

Miss Universo Portugal

Before 2011 Miss Portugal 1959 to Miss Portugal 2001 winner participated at Miss Universe competition. Between 2002 and 2010 there was no franchise holder to sign up the Miss Universe organization. began 2011 the new pageant held as 'Miss Universo Portugal" contest and it continued in 2014 as a beginning from Miss República Portuguesa by Isidiro de Brito Directorship. Since 2014 the Portuguese representative at Miss Universe will be crowned at Miss Universo Portugal competition (separate contest but still in under Isidiro de Brito directorship). On occasion, when the winner does not qualify (due to age) for either contest, a runner-up is sent. Beginning in 2022, a separate Miss Universo Portugal has been created.

Miss World Portugal
Before 2003 1st Runner-up of Miss Portugal mostly designated to compete at Miss World competition. Since 2014 the Miss República Portuguesa set the winner to compete at Miss World.

Miss International Portugal
Before 2011 2nd Runner-up of Miss Portugal mostly designated to compete at Miss International competition. Since 2011 the Miss República Portuguesa set one of runners-up to compete at Miss International.

Miss Supranational Portugal 
Since 2016 the Miss República Portuguesa set one of runners-up to compete at Miss Supranational.

Miss Grand Portugal 
Since 2013 the Miss República Portuguesa set one of runners-up to compete at Miss Grand International

Reina Hispanoamericana Portugal

Reinado Internacional del Café Portugal

Miss Tourism Portugal

See also

Miss Portugal

References

External links

Portugal
 
Portugal
Portugal
Portugal
Portuguese awards
Beauty pageants in Portugal
Recurring events established in 1959
1959 establishments in Portugal